Midway is an unincorporated community in Raleigh County, West Virginia, United States. Midway is located between Sophia and Crab Orchard.

References

Unincorporated communities in Raleigh County, West Virginia
Unincorporated communities in West Virginia